The following is a list of characters in Water Margin, one of the Four Great Classical Novels of Chinese literature.

108 Stars of Destiny

The 108 Stars of Destiny are at the core of the plot of Water Margin. Based on the Taoist concept that each person's destiny is tied to a "Star of Destiny", the 108 Stars of Destiny are stars representing 108 demonic overlords who were banished by the deity Shangdi. Having repented since their expulsion, the 108 Stars are accidentally released from their place of confinement, and are reborn in the world as 108 heroes who band together for the cause of justice. They are divided into the 36 Heavenly Spirits and 72 Earthly Fiends.

36 Heavenly Spirits
The 36 Heavenly Spirits are:

 Song Jiang, nicknamed "Protector of Righteousness" and "Timely Rain"
 Lu Junyi, nicknamed "Jade Qilin"
 Wu Yong, nicknamed "Resourceful Star"
 Gongsun Sheng, nicknamed "Dragon in the Clouds"
 Guan Sheng, nicknamed "Great Blade"
 Lin Chong, nicknamed "Panther Head"
 Qin Ming, nicknamed "Fiery Thunderbolt"
 Huyan Zhuo, nicknamed "Double Clubs"
 Hua Rong, nicknamed "Little Li Guang"
 Chai Jin, nicknamed "Little Whirlwind"
 Li Ying, nicknamed "Striking Hawk"
 Zhu Tong, nicknamed "Lord of the Beautiful Beard"
 Lu Zhishen, nicknamed "Flowery Monk"
 Wu Song, nicknamed "Pilgrim"
 Dong Ping, nicknamed "General of Double Spears"
 Zhang Qing, nicknamed "Featherless Arrow"
 Yang Zhi, nicknamed "Blue Faced Beast"
 Xu Ning, nicknamed "Gold Lancer"
 Suo Chao, nicknamed "Impatient Vanguard"
 Dai Zong, nicknamed "Magic Traveller"
 Liu Tang, nicknamed "Red Haired Devil"
 Li Kui, nicknamed "Black Whirlwind"
 Shi Jin, nicknamed "Nine Tattooed Dragons"
 Mu Hong, nicknamed "Unrestrained"
 Lei Heng, nicknamed "Winged Tiger"
 Li Jun, nicknamed "Turbulent River Dragon"
 Ruan Xiaoer, nicknamed "Tai Sui Who Stands His Ground"
 Zhang Heng, nicknamed "Boatman"
 Ruan Xiaowu, nicknamed "Short-lived Second Brother"
 Zhang Shun, nicknamed "White Stripe in the Waves"
 Ruan Xiaoqi, nicknamed "Living King Yama"
 Yang Xiong, nicknamed "Sick Guan Suo"
 Shi Xiu, nicknamed "Daredevil Third Brother"
 Xie Zhen, nicknamed "Double-headed Serpent"
 Xie Bao, nicknamed "Twin-tailed Scorpion"
 Yan Qing, nicknamed "Prodigal/Wanderer"

72 Earthly Fiends
The 72 Earthly Fiends are:

 Zhu Wu, nicknamed "Resourceful Strategist"
 Huang Xin, nicknamed "Guardian of Three Mountains"
 Sun Li, nicknamed "Sick Yuchi"
 Xuan Zan, nicknamed "Ugly Prince Consort"
 Hao Siwen, nicknamed "Wood Dog of Well"
 Han Tao, nicknamed "General of a Hundred Victories"
 Peng Qi, nicknamed "General of Heavenly Vision"
 Shan Tinggui, nicknamed "General of Sacred Water"
 Wei Dingguo, nicknamed "General of Holy Fire"
 Xiao Rang, nicknamed "Sacred Handed Scholar"
 Pei Xuan, nicknamed "Iron Faced Magistrate's Clerk"
 Ou Peng, nicknamed "Golden Wings Brushing Against the Clouds"
 Deng Fei, nicknamed "Fiery Eyed Suan-ni"
 Yan Shun, nicknamed "Multicoloured Tiger"
 Yang Lin, nicknamed "Multicoloured Leopard"
 Ling Zhen, nicknamed "Heaven Shaking Thunder"
 Jiang Jing, nicknamed "Divine Mathematician"
 Lü Fang, nicknamed "Little Marquis of Wen"
 Guo Sheng, nicknamed "Comparable to Rengui"
 An Daoquan, nicknamed "Divine Physician"
 Huangfu Duan, nicknamed "Purple Bearded Count"
 Wang Ying, nicknamed "Stumpy Tiger"
 Hu Sanniang, nicknamed "Ten Feet of Blue"
 Bao Xu, nicknamed "God of Death"
 Fan Rui, nicknamed "Demon King of Chaos"
 Kong Ming, nicknamed "Hairy Star"
 Kong Liang, nicknamed "Lonely Fiery Star"
 Xiang Chong, nicknamed "Eight-armed Nezha"
 Li Gun, nicknamed "Sky Soaring Great Sage"
 Jin Dajian, nicknamed "Jade Armed Craftsman"
 Ma Lin, nicknamed "Iron Flute Deity"
 Tong Wei, nicknamed "Dragon Emerging from a Cave"
 Tong Meng, nicknamed "River Churning Clam"
 Meng Kang, nicknamed "Jade Flagpole"
 Hou Jian, nicknamed "Long Armed Ape"
 Chen Da, nicknamed "Stream Leaping Tiger"
 Yang Chun, nicknamed "White Flower Serpent"
 Zheng Tianshou, nicknamed "Fair Skinned Gentleman"
 Tao Zongwang, nicknamed "Nine Tailed Turtle"
 Song Qing, nicknamed "Iron Fan"
 Yue He, nicknamed "Iron Whistle"
 Gong Wang, nicknamed "Flowery Necked Tiger"
 Ding Desun, nicknamed "Arrow-hit Tiger"
 Mu Chun, nicknamed "Little Restrained"
 Cao Zheng, nicknamed "Knife Wielding Demon"
 Song Wan, nicknamed "Giant in the Clouds"
 Du Qian, nicknamed "Touching the Sky"
 Xue Yong, nicknamed "Sick Tiger"
 Shi En, nicknamed "Golden Eyed Tiger Cub"
 Li Zhong, nicknamed "Tiger Slaying General"
 Zhou Tong, nicknamed "Little Conqueror"
 Tang Long, nicknamed "Gold Coin Spotted Leopard"
 Du Xing, nicknamed "Demon Face"
 Zou Yuan, nicknamed "Forest Emerging Dragon"
 Zou Run, nicknamed "Single Horned Dragon"
 Zhu Gui, nicknamed "Dry Land Alligator"
 Zhu Fu, nicknamed "Sneering Tiger"
 Cai Fu, nicknamed "Iron Arm"
 Cai Qing, nicknamed "Stalk of Flower"
 Li Li, nicknamed "Life Taking Judge"
 Li Yun, nicknamed "Green Eyed Tiger"
 Jiao Ting, nicknamed "Faceless"
 Shi Yong, nicknamed "Stone General"
 Sun Xin, nicknamed "Little Yuchi"
 Gu Dasao, nicknamed "Female Tiger"
 Zhang Qing, nicknamed "Gardener"
 Sun Erniang, nicknamed "Female Yaksha"
 Wang Dingliu, nicknamed "Living Goddess of Lightning"
 Yu Baosi, nicknamed "God of the Dangerous Road"
 Bai Sheng, nicknamed "Daylight Rat"
 Shi Qian, nicknamed "Flea on a Drum"
 Duan Jingzhu, nicknamed "Golden Haired Hound"

Chao Gai's story

 He Tao is an official from Jizhou (covering parts of present-day southwest Shandong) assigned to investigate the theft of the birthday gifts for Cai Jing. After identifying Chao Gai as one of the seven thieves, he leads his soldiers to arrest them. However, he suffers a disastrous defeat in the area around Liangshan Marsh, and ends up being captured by Chao Gai and his friends. Ruan Xiaoqi cuts off one of his ears before releasing him to report his defeat to the Jizhou government.
 He Qing is He Tao's younger brother. He is coincidentally near Yellow Soil Ridge the day before Chao Gai and his friends steal the birthday gifts. Although he does not know them personally, he recognises Chao Gai as the headman of Dongxi Village. Later, when He Tao is investigating the robbery, He Qing provides him with a lead by saying that he saw Chao Gai and six others suspiciously interacting with Bai Sheng the day before the robbery. Using this information, He Tao tracks down Bai Sheng, finds part of the loot in Bai Sheng's house, and confirms that Chao Gai is one of the thieves.
 Huang An is a military officer from Jizhou assigned to lead soldiers to attack Liangshan after He Tao's failed attempt to arrest Chao Gai and his friends. He is killed by Liu Tang while attempting to escape after his defeat.

Song Jiang's story

 Yan Poxi is Song Jiang's concubine. Her mother pressured her to become Song Jiang's concubine as an expression of gratitude after he paid for her father's funeral. Over time, she increasingly resents Song Jiang, who deliberately avoids spending time with her, and starts a secret affair with his assistant Zhang Wenyuan. One night, she discovers Chao Gai's letter to Song Jiang, and threatens to report Song Jiang to the magistrate for associating with the outlaws unless he agrees to three conditions: 1) allow her to marry Zhang Wenyuan; 2) let her keep all the clothes, ornaments, property, etc., he has given her; and 3) give her the gold bars from Chao Gai. Song Jiang agrees but cannot fulfil the third condition because he only accepted one of the one hundred gold bars mentioned in Chao Gai's letter. Yan Poxi refuses to believe him and continues to threaten to report him. Song Jiang eventually loses patience and stabs her to death in a fit of anger. He then burns the letter and escapes from Yuncheng County.
 Zhang Wenyuan is Song Jiang's assistant at the magistrate's office. He has a secret affair with Yan Poxi.
 Shi Wenbin is the magistrate of Yuncheng County.
 Liu Gao is the official in charge of Qingfeng Fort. He believes his wife's account and orders Song Jiang's arrest. Along with the rest of his family, he is killed by the Mount Qingfeng outlaws when they overrun the fort.
 Liu Gao's wife was captured by the Mount Qingfeng outlaws and almost raped by Wang Ying. However, Song Jiang intervenes and manages to convince Wang Ying to release her. Later, she repays Song Jiang's kindness with evil by falsely accusing him of being the outlaw who kidnapped and attempted to rape her.
 Murong Yanda is the governor of Qingzhou (covering parts of present-day Shandong). He orders the execution of Qin Ming's family after mistakenly believing that the latter has joined the Mount Qingfeng outlaws. Huyan Zhuo comes to Qingzhou to join him after his defeat and helps him in attacking some outlaws in Qingzhou. After the Liangshan outlaws capture Huyan Zhuo and convince him to surrender and join them, Huyan Zhuo tricks Murong Yanda into opening Qingzhou's gates for the outlaws to enter and overrun the city. Qin Ming captures and kills Murong Yanda to avenge his family.
 Cai Dezhang, better known as Cai Jiu, is Cai Jing's ninth son and the governor of Jiangzhou (present-day Jiujiang, Jiangxi). An unintelligent, greedy and corrupt official, he sentences Song Jiang and Dai Zong to death after believing that Song Jiang is plotting a rebellion.
 Huang Wenbing, nicknamed "Wasp's Sting", is a petty official from Jiangzhou. A scheming and unscrupulous man, he chances upon Song Jiang's seditious poem and reports it to Cai Jiu in the hope of becoming famous for exposing a rebellious plot. After Song Jiang narrowly escapes execution in Jiangzhou, he seeks revenge against Huang Wenbing, and gets the Liangshan outlaws to help him. The outlaws break into Huang Wenbing's house, kill his family, and burn down his house. Huang Wenbing, who is not at home at the time, tries to escape but gets captured by Zhang Shun, who bring him before Song Jiang and the other outlaws. Huang Wenbing is killed by Li Kui.
 Huang Wenye, nicknamed "Buddha Huang", is Huang Wenbing's elder brother. In contrast with his wicked brother, he is known for his kindness and for helping those in need. When the Liangshan outlaws kill Huang Wenbing's family, Hou Jian manages to persuade his fellow outlaws to spare Huang Wenye by pointing out that Huang Wenye is a good man.
 The Mysterious Lady of the Nine Heavens is a deity whom Song Jiang encounters on two separate occasions. The first time, he takes shelter in a temple while evading soldiers trying to arrest him, and encounters the deity, who presents him a set of three divine books to aid him in his quest to "deliver justice on Heaven's behalf". The second time, she appears in his dream when he is leading the Liangshan forces to resist the Liao invaders, and teaches him how to break the Liao forces' battle formation.

Lu Junyi's story

 Madam Jia is Lu Junyi's wife. She has a secret affair with Li Gu, and collaborates with him to frame her husband for plotting a rebellion. After Lu Junyi is saved by the Liangshan outlaws, he returns home and takes his revenge against his wife and Li Gu by killing them.
 Li Gu is Lu Junyi's steward. He has a secret affair with his master's wife, and falsely reports to the authorities that his master is plotting a rebellion, using a poem as evidence. Even after Lu Junyi is arrested, Li Gu still feels uneasy so he tries to bribe the guards to murder his master in prison. However, his plans are thwarted by Chai Jin, who bribes the executioners Cai Fu and Cai Qing to take good care of Lu Junyi. After Lu Junyi is saved by the Liangshan outlaws, he goes home and kills his wife and Li Gu in revenge.

Lin Chong's story

 Gao Yanei, nicknamed "Tai Sui of Flowers", is Gao Qiu's lecherous foster son. After seeing Lin Chong's wife at the temple, he becomes sexually attracted to her and tries to molest her but Lin Chong shows up and stops him. Unwilling to give up on Lin Chong's wife, he gets Lu Qian and Fu'an to help him lure her into a trap: Lu Qian pretends to invite Lin Chong out for drinks, while Fu'an lies to Lin Chong's wife that her husband has become unconscious after drinking, and tricks her into entering Lu Qian's house, where Gao Yanei is waiting. Lin Chong's wife puts up resistance when Gao Yanei tries to force himself on her. In the meantime, Jin'er escapes and informs her master, who rushes to Lu Qian's house to save his wife. Gao Yanei flees when he hears Lin Chong approaching. Gao Yanei later falls sick due to his obsession with Lin Chong's wife. Fu'an and Lu Qian help him by plotting to eliminate Lin Chong so that Gao Yanei can take Lin Chong's wife. In the plot, Lin Chong is tricked into entering the White Tiger Hall while carrying a sabre, and framed for attempting to assassinate Gao Qiu.
 Lin Chong's wife hangs herself after Gao Qiu repeatedly pressures her to marry Gao Yanei.
 Jin'er is a maid in Lin Chong's household.
 Instructor Zhang is Lin Chong's father-in-law. He is also a martial arts instructor of the Imperial Guards.
 Lu Qian is an old friend of Lin Chong. When Lin Chong first met him, he was still roaming the streets so Lin Chong took pity on him and helped him find a job. Lu Qian subsequently becomes a yuhou under Gao Qiu. He repays Lin Chong's kindness with evil by collaborating with Gao Qiu and Gao Yanei to frame Lin Chong and cause him to be exiled to Cangzhou. Gao Qiu later sends Lu Qian to Cangzhou to bribe the officials there to murder Lin Chong. However, their plot fails and Lin Chong kills Lu Qian in revenge.
 Fu'an, nicknamed "Bird Head", is Gao Yanei's servant. Acting on Gao Qiu's instruction, he travels to Cangzhou with Lu Qian to bribe the officials there to murder Lin Chong. However, they end up being killed by Lin Chong instead.
 Prefect Teng is the prefect of Kaifeng.
 Sun Ding, nicknamed "Buddha Sun", is a kongmu (court clerk) serving under Prefect Teng. Famous for his righteousness and kindness, he knows that Lin Chong is innocent so he tries to help Lin Chong by urging Prefect Teng to not give in to pressure from Gao Qiu to sentence Lin Chong to death.
 Dong Chao and Xue Ba are the guards assigned to escort Lin Chong to Cangzhou. They have been bribed by Gao Qiu to kill Lin Chong along the way. They mistreat and abuse Lin Chong throughout the journey, including scalding his feet with boiling water. When they arrive at Wild Boar Woods, they attempt to kill Lin Chong but Lu Zhishen shows up and saves Lin Chong. When Lu Zhishen wants to kill the guards, Lin Chong stops him and insists on serving his sentence so Lu Zhishen forces the guards to take good care of Lin Chong and sees him safely to Cangzhou. In a later chapter, Dong Chao and Xue Ba are assigned to escort Lu Junyi to Shamen Island. They have also been bribed by Li Gu to kill Lu Junyi along the way and they treat Lu Junyi in the same way as they did to Lin Chong. They are killed by Yan Qing when they are about to murder Lu Junyi.
 Instructor Hong is a martial arts instructor in Chai Jin's residence. An arrogant man, he behaves rudely towards Lin Chong, whom he sees as an inferior convict. He leaves in shame after losing to Lin Chong in a contest.
 Wang Lun is the first chief of Liangshan. He is described to be a reckless and selfish man who is unwilling to accept others who are better than him out of fear that they will usurp his position as chief. However, he invites Yang Zhi to join his band as soon as they are introduced, albeit without sincerity. Wang Lun initially tries to send away Lin Chong, but eventually backs down and allows him to stay at Liangshan. When Wang Lun tries to send away Chao Gai and his friends, Lin Chong turns furious and kills Wang Lun.

Chai Jin's story

 Gao Lian is Gao Qiu's cousin and the corrupt governor of Gaotangzhou (around present-day Gaotang County, Shandong). After Li Kui kills Yin Tianxi, Gao Lian holds Chai Jin responsible and orders him imprisoned. When the Liangshan outlaws attack Gaotangzhou to save Chai Jin, Gao Lian uses his mastery of dark magic to hold off the outlaws. However, he eventually loses when Gongsun Sheng shows up and breaks his dark magic, thus allowing the Liangshan outlaws to break into Gaotangzhou and save Chai Jin. Gao Lian is killed by Lei Heng after falling off his magical cloud while attempting to escape.
 Yin Tianxi is Gao Lian's relative. He bullies the people by abusing the privileges from his relationship with Gao Lian. On one occasion, he tries to take over the Chai family residence and beats up Chai Jin's elderly uncle, who later dies from his injuries. Chai Jin, accompanied by Li Kui, goes to confront Yin Tianxi. When Yin Tianxi insults Chai Jin, Li Kui loses his temper and kills Yin Tianxi in anger.
 Yu Zhi, Wen Wenbao and Xue Yuanhui are three military officers serving under Gao Lian in Gaotangzhou. They are killed by Lin Chong, Qin Ming and Hua Rong respectively.

Lu Zhishen's story

 Jin Cuilian is a young woman bullied by Butcher Zheng, who wanted to make her his concubine. After she entered the Zheng household, Zheng's wife hated her and pressured her husband to force Jin Cuilian to leave. Embarrassed by the incident, Zheng forces Jin Cuilian and her father to compensate him, and refuses to allow them to leave until they paid him a large sum of money. Left with no choice, Jin Cuilian and her father try to earn enough by street-performing in order to pay their "debt". On one occasion, Jin Cuilian cries over her plight and attracts Lu Zhishen's attention. After hearing her story, a furious Lu Zhishen confronts Zheng and ends up killing him in anger. Jin Cuilian and her father flee from town and eventually find shelter under the kindly Squire Zhao.
 Butcher Zheng, nicknamed "Guardian of the West", is a butcher from Weizhou (around present-day Pingliang, Gansu) who abuses his wealth by bullying the poor. After failing to take Jin Cuilian as his concubine, he forces her and her father to compensate him. When Lu Zhishen hears about it, he confronts Zheng and ends up killing him with just three punches to the head.
 Squire Zhao is a wealthy squire who marries Jin Cuilian through matchmaking shortly after she and her father escape from Weizhou. Jin Cuilian's father meets Lu Da, who is on the run after killing Butcher Zheng, and brings him to Squire Zhao's house. Squire Zhao, who has a penchant for befriending jianghu figures, welcomes Lu Da and recommends him to be a monk on Mount Wutai.
 Elder Zhizhen is the abbot of Manjusri Monastery on Mount Wutai. He is a close friend of Squire Zhao.
 Squire Liu is the master of Peach Blossom Manor. His daughter attracts the attention of Zhou Tong, who tries to force her to marry him. Lu Zhishen, who was spending a night at the manor, hears about the Lius' problem and decides to help them. He ambushes Zhou Tong in the dark and beats him up. Zhou Tong later returns with his partner Li Zhong to take revenge against Lu Zhishen. However, Li Zhong is surprised to see Lu Zhishen, whom he met and befriended in Weizhou. The conflict is resolved when Li Zhong manages to convince Zhou Tong to give up on Squire Liu's daughter and stop harassing the Lius.
 Cui Daocheng and Qiu Xiaoyi, nicknamed "Living Iron Buddha" and "Sky Flying Yaksha" respectively, are two bandits who disguise themselves as a Buddhist monk and a Taoist priest. They raze a temple to the ground and drive away most of its occupants except a few elderly monks. Lu Zhishen passes by the temple on his journey to Dongjing and encounters the two bandits, who attempt to deceive and kill him for his valuables. Later, with Shi Jin's help, Lu Zhishen defeats and kills the two bandits.
 Elder Zhiqing is Elder Zhizhen's junior and the abbot of Daxiangguo Temple in Dongjing.
 Zhang San and Li Si, nicknamed "Street Crossing Rat" and "Green Grass Snake" respectively, are the leaders of a gang of hooligans in Dongjing. They steal vegetables from the garden in Daxiangguo Temple for a living. When Lu Zhishen first moved in as the new caretaker of the garden, the hooligans attempt to intimidate him into allowing them to take the vegetables freely. However, Lu Zhishen overpowers and throws them into a pit of faeces. Awed by Lu Zhishen's strength, the hooligans surrender to him and become his followers.
 Deng Long is the chief of a bandit gang based on Mount Twin Dragons. He is killed by Lu Zhishen, Yang Zhi and Cao Zheng, who seize control of his stronghold.

Wu Song's story

 Wu Dalang, nicknamed "Three-cun Nail" for his short stature and ugly appearance, is Wu Song's elder brother. He is murdered by Pan Jinlian and Ximen Qing.
 Pan Jinlian is Wu Dalang's wife. With Granny Wang's help, she starts a secret affair with Ximen Qing. When Wu Dalang catches them in bed, Ximen Qing kicks him in the abdomen and causes him to be bedridden. Out of fear that Wu Dalang will tell his brother about them, Pan Jinlian and Ximen Qing murder him by poisoning his medicine. Pan Jinlian even hastens Wu Dalang's death by smothering him with a blanket while he is struggling under the effects of poison. Pan Jinlian is eventually killed by Wu Song after she confesses to the murder.
 Ximen Qing is an influential merchant in Yanggu County. With Granny Wang's help, he starts a secret affair with Pan Jinlian and collaborates with her to murder Wu Dalang when he finds out about their affair. Wu Song confronts him at Lion Tower later and kills him after a vicious fight.
 Granny Wang is Wu Dalang's neighbour who runs a teahouse opposite his home. She secretly helps Pan Jinlian and Ximen Qing get together, and abets them in murdering Wu Dalang. After obtaining Pan Jinlian's confession and killing her, Wu Song brings Granny Wang to the county office to face justice. Granny Wang is ultimately convicted of abetting murder and sentenced to execution by lingchi.
 He Jiu is the coroner who inspects Wu Dalang's corpse. He knows that Wu Dalang died of poisoning but he keeps silent because he has been bribed by Ximen Qing. Haunted by his conscience, he secretly keeps a darkened bone from Wu Dalang's cremated body as evidence of poisoning. When Wu Song approaches him later, he agrees to appear in court as a witness.
 Yun'ge is a street urchin who befriends Wu Dalang and makes a living by selling pears. He knows of Pan Jinlian and Ximen Qing's affair and tells Wu Dalang about it. Later, he helps Wu Song by appearing in court as a witness.
 Zhang Mengfang is a military inspector in Mengzhou. He collaborates with Jiang Zhong and Instructor Zhang to frame Wu Song for theft, and then bribes the guards escorting Wu Song to kill him along the way. However, Wu Song kills the guards instead, returns to Mengzhou to take his revenge, and kills Zhang Mengfang and his family.
 Instructor Zhang is Zhang Mengfang's sworn brother and Jiang Zhong's friend. He collaborates with them to frame Wu Song for theft. Wu Song survives and returns to Mengzhou to take his revenge and kill them at Mandarin Ducks Tower.
 Jiang Zhong is a hooligan nicknamed "Jiang the Door God" for his big stature and fighting skills. He beats up Shi En and seizes Shi En's restaurant for himself. Shi En seeks help from Wu Song, who defeats Jiang Zhong in a fight and demands that he return the restaurant and leave Mengzhou for good. Jiang Zhong plots his revenge with Zhang Mengfang and Instructor Zhang, who work together to frame Wu Song for theft. Wu Song survives the journey into exile and returns to take his revenge. Jiang Zhong is killed by Wu Song at Mandarin Ducks Tower.

 Taoist Wang, nicknamed "Flying Centipede", is an evil Taoist priest living in a temple at Centipede Ridge. Wu Song passes by the temple during his journey to Mount Twin Dragons, kills the evil Taoist and saves a woman from being raped by him.

Dong Ping's story

 Cheng Wanli is the prefect of Dongping Prefecture. When Dong Ping was still serving as a military officer in Dongping Prefecture, he made many requests to marry Cheng Wanli's daughter but was refused. After defecting to the Liangshan outlaws, Dong Ping kills Cheng Wanli and forces his daughter to marry him.

Yang Zhi's story

 Niu Er, nicknamed "Hairless Tiger", is a hooligan who bullies and terrorises the locals in Dongjing (present-day Kaifeng). The authorities do not dare to interfere because he has connections to the aristocracy. When Yang Zhi is selling his sabre on the streets, he encounters Niu Er, who demands to test the weapon's special properties. As Yang Zhi is desperate to sell the sabre, he reluctantly agrees the hooligan's demand. However, when Niu Er orders him to kill a man with the sabre to prove that its blade will not be stained with blood, Yang Zhi refuses and tries to leave but ends up accidentally killing Niu Er when the latter attempts to snatch the sabre from him.
 Liang Shijie, better known as Grand Secretary Liang, is Cai Jing's son-in-law and the governor of Daming Prefecture. When Yang Zhi is exiled to Daming Prefecture, Liang Shijie recruits him as his subordinate after Yang Zhi impresses him with his skills in a martial arts contest. Liang Shijie later puts Yang Zhi in charge of escorting a convoy of birthday gifts to his father-in-law in Dongjing. However, the gifts are stolen by Chao Gai and his friends, who flee to Liangshan Marsh and join the outlaw band there. Fearing that he will be punished for his failure, Yang Zhi abandons his men and later becomes an outlaw too. Since then, Liang Shijie has been holding a grudge against the Liangshan outlaws. When Lu Junyi is arrested and accused of being in league with the Liangshan outlaws, Liang Shijie vents his frustration on Lu Junyi by ordering him to be tortured and ill-treated in prison.
 Zhou Jin is Suo Chao's apprentice and a military officer serving under Liang Shijie. He is dismissed from office after losing to Yang Zhi in a martial arts contest.
 Li Cheng and Wen Da are two military officers serving in Daming Prefecture. They are defeated in battle by the Liangshan outlaws.

Li Kui's story

 Li Da is Li Kui's elder brother. When Li Kui goes home to fetch his mother to Liangshan, he lies to her that he has become a government official and has come to bring her to live with him. Just then, Li Da comes home and exposes his brother's lies; Li Kui has actually become an outlaw. The Li brothers then get into a heated quarrel. Li Da, knowing that he cannot win Li Kui in a fight, leaves the house to seek help from others. In the meantime, Li Kui leaves behind some money for his brother and carries his mother on his back as they make their way through the woods to Liangshan.
 Li Kui's mother is killed and eaten by tigers when Li Kui leaves her for a while to find water. In revenge, Li Kui tracks down the four tigers to their lair and kills them.
 Li Gui is a man who impersonates Li Kui and robs passersby in the woods in Li Kui's name. He encounters Li Kui, who is on his way home to fetch his mother to Liangshan, and loses to him in a fight. Just as Li Kui is about to kill him, Li Gui lies that he has an elderly mother who depends on him, and pleads for his life. Li Kui, believing that Li Gui is a filial son, releases him. After getting home, Li Gui plots with his wife to capture Li Kui and hand him over to the authorities for a reward. However, Li Kui passes by, overhears their conversation, and barges in and kills Li Gui.
 Li Gui's wife plots with her husband to capture Li Kui and collect the bounty on his head. However, Li Kui overhears their conversation and kills Li Gui. Li Gui's wife manages to escape and take shelter under Squire Cao.
 Squire Cao is a wealthy squire living in a town near Li Kui's home. He plots to capture Li Kui and hand him to the authorities for a reward after learning of Li Kui's true identity from Li Gui's wife. He pretends to be hospitable and sympathetic towards Li Kui. The unsuspecting Li Kui indulges in alcohol to forget the sorrow of losing his mother. When Li Kui is drunk, Squire Cao sends his servant to inform the local magistrate, who orders Li Yun and a group of soldiers to tie up Li Kui and bring him to the county prison. Along the way, Zhu Gui and Zhu Fu pretend to offer food and wine to Li Yun and his men. When Li Yun and the others become unconscious, the Zhu brothers free Li Kui, who proceeds to kill Squire Cao, Li Gui's wife and all the soldiers.
 Taoist Luo is a Taoist sorcerer and Gongsun Sheng's master. When the Liangshan outlaws are attacking Gaotangzhou to rescue Chai Jin, they are held back by Gao Lian's dark magic so Song Jiang sends Dai Zong and Li Kui to find Gongsun Sheng to help them. When Taoist Luo refuses to allow his apprentice to leave, Li Kui sneaks up on the sorcerer at night and kills him. The following day, Li Kui is shocked to see that Taoist Luo is alive and well. Taoist Luo then agrees to let Gongsun Sheng leave with them.
 Han Bolong is an outlaw who wanted to join Liangshan but had no opportunity to formally introduce himself to Song Jiang. While waiting, he was assigned by Zhu Gui to run a tavern near Liangshan to gather information from travellers. On one occasion, he encounters Li Kui, who refused to pay after having a meal at the tavern, and quarrels with him. Li Kui kills him in anger.

Shi Jin's story

 Wang Jin is a martial arts instructor of the Imperial Guards. His father taught Gao Qiu a painful lesson when Gao Qiu was still a street ruffian. Gao Qiu seeks vengeance on Wang Jin after he became a Grand Marshal. Wang Jin knows that Gao Qiu will not let him off so he escapes with his mother. They pass by Shi Jin's home and take shelter there. Wang Jin instructs Shi Jin in martial arts.
 Wang Sheng was Wang Jin's father. He was also a martial arts instructor.
 Squire Shi is Shi Jin's father. He dies of illness not long after Wang Jin leaves their manor.
 Wang Si is a servant in Shi Jin's household. He is nicknamed "As Good as Bodang" because he has a glib tongue and knows how to handle a variety of situations. On one occasion, he loses a letter written by the Mount Shaohua outlaws to Shi Jin, and keeps quiet about it. Shi Jin kills him after finding out that he is responsible for leaking out news to the authorities about Shi Jin's friendship with the outlaws.
 Li Ji is a hunter who reports Shi Jin to the authorities for associating with the Mount Shaohua outlaws after stealing the letter from Wang Si. Shi Jin sets fire to his manor, fights his way out, and kills Li Ji along the way.
 Prefect He is a corrupt official who seizes the daughter of a craftsman. Shi Jin breaks into his residence to assassinate him and rescue the girl but fails and ends up being captured. Lu Zhishen attempts to rescue Shi Jin but fails and gets captured too. Later, Song Jiang impersonates Marshal Su Yuanjing and lures Prefect He out of the city to pay his respects. When Prefect He comes out, he is killed by Xie Zhen and Xie Bao. The Liangshan outlaws then break into the city and rescue Shi Jin and Lu Zhishen.
 Wang Yi is a craftsman whose daughter is abducted by Prefect He.
 Li Ruilan is a prostitute from Dongping Prefecture and Shi Jin's acquaintance. When the Liangshan outlaws are attacking Dongping Prefecture, Shi Jin offers to make use of his relationship with Li Ruilan to work as a spy for Liangshan inside the city. However, the brothel owner finds out and secretly reports Shi Jin to the authorities, who capture Shi Jin in an ambush. Shi Jin is saved after the outlaws defeat the government forces and break into Dongping Prefecture.

Lei Heng's story

 Bai Yuqiao is Bai Xiuying's father. Lei Heng goes to watch their performance but forgets to bring any money with him. The Bais pester Lei Heng to pay up and insult him when he says he has no money. Lei Heng beats up Bai Yuqiao in anger but is arrested later since Bai Yuqiao has connections with the corrupt officials.
 Bai Xiuying is a singer who insulted Lei Heng when he watched her performance without paying. Lei Heng hits her father in anger and is arrested and put in chains. When Lei Heng's mother goes to visit him, Bai Xiuying insults her and slaps her. Lei Heng cannot tolerate Bai Xiuying's attitude towards his mother and kills her in anger by slamming his shackles on her.

Li Jun's story

The following persons are jianghu figures living around the Lake Tai area. They become sworn brothers with Li Jun and eventually follow him to Siam, where he becomes king.

 Fei Bao, nicknamed "Red Whiskers Dragon".
 Ni Yun, nicknamed "Curly Haired Tiger".
 Bu Qing, nicknamed "Lake Tai Dragon".
 Di Cheng, nicknamed "Narrow Faced Bear".

Zhang Shun's story

 Zhang Wang, nicknamed "River Pirate Devil", is a pirate who robs Zhang Shun while the latter is on a journey to find An Daoquan to cure Song Jiang. Zhang Wang ties up Zhang Shun and throws him into the river, but Zhang Shun manages to break his bonds and swim away. On the return journey, Zhang Shun encounters Zhang Wang again and he takes his revenge by tying up Zhang Wang and throwing him into the river.
 Sun Wu, nicknamed "Loach in Oil", is Zhang Wang's accomplice. Zhang Wang kills him when they have a quarrel over the loot after robbing Zhang Shun.
 Li Qiaonu is a prostitute and An Daoquan's lover. When Zhang Shun goes to find An Daoquan to cure Song Jiang's illness, Li Qiaonu refuses to allow An Daoquan to leave. Zhang Shun then secretly kills Li Qiaonu and writes "An Daoquan is the killer" on the wall near the crime scene to frame An Daoquan, who has no choice but to leave with Zhang Shun and become an outlaw.

Yang Xiong's story

 Pan Qiaoyun is Yang Xiong's wife. She has a secret affair with Pei Ruhai and falsely accuses Shi Xiu of molesting her after he discovers their affair. Shi Xiu kills Pei Ruhai and brings Pan Qiaoyun to Cuiping Hill, where Yang Xiong interrogates her and kills her after she confesses to the affair.
 Pei Ruhai, also known as "Haigong", is a Buddhist monk who has a secret affair with Pan Qiaoyun. He is killed by Shi Xiu.
 Ying'er is Pan Qiaoyun's servant. She has been helping her mistress cover up her affair with Pei Ruhai. She is killed by Yang Xiong.

Xie brothers' story

 Squire Mao is a wealthy squire in Dengzhou (in present-day Shandong). The Xie brothers are sent to hunt down and kill a ferocious tiger. The tiger is wounded and rolls down the hill and lands in Mao's backyard. The Xies go to Mao's residence to claim the tiger but Mao has already sent his men with the dead tiger to the county office to collect his reward. Mao frames the Xies for attempting to rob him and bribes the magistrate to sentence them to death. The Xie brothers are later rescued by Gu Dasao, Sun Xin and others, and they return to take revenge on Mao by killing him and his family.

Zhu Family Village
 Zhu Chaofeng is the headman of the village. He abuses his connections with the local authorities by bullying the people living around his village. He also provokes the Liangshan outlaws by insulting its leaders and declaring that he will destroy Liangshan one day. His actions harden the outlaws' decision to attack his village. After the village falls, he tries to escape but runs into Shi Xiu, who beheads him.
 Zhu Long is Zhu Chaofeng's first son. He is killed by Lin Chong while attempting to escape after the village is taken by the outlaws.
 Zhu Hu is Zhu Chaofeng's second son. He is killed by Lü Fang and Guo Sheng, who skewer him with their spears.
 Zhu Biao is Zhu Chaofeng's youngest son. He was originally engaged to Hu Sanniang of the neighbouring Hu Family Village. After the Zhu Family Village falls, Zhu Biao flees to the Hu Family Village and hopes that the Hus will help him. However, Hu Cheng binds him and sends him to Liangshan in exchange for his sister, who had been captured earlier by the outlaws. Zhu Biao is killed by Li Kui while being escorted to the Liangshan camp.
 Luan Tingyu, nicknamed "Iron Staff", is Zhu Chaofeng's adviser and a martial arts instructor in the village. He learnt martial arts from the same master as Sun Li. Sun Li makes use of his friendship with Luan Tingyu to infiltrate the village and work as a spy for Liangshan. Luan Tingyu is purportedly killed in battle when the Liangshan outlaws overrun the village.
 Old Man Zhongli is an old man who instructs Shi Xiu on how to avoid the traps in the village. Shi rescues him later after the village falls to the outlaws.

Zeng Family Fortress
 Zeng Nong is the headman of the fortress. Initially hostile towards the Liangshan outlaws, he regrets later when two of his sons are killed by the outlaws. After failing to make peace with the outlaws, he hangs himself when the outlaws overrun the fortress.
 Zeng Tu is Zeng Nong's first son. He fights with Lü Fang and Guo Sheng and tries to kill them when their spears are entangled but falls off his horse after being hit by an arrow fired by Hua Rong. Lü Fang and Guo Sheng then seize the opportunity to spear him together after he is down.
 Zeng Mi is Zeng Nong's second son. He is killed by Zhu Tong when the outlaws overrun the fortress.
 Zeng Suo is Zeng Nong's third son. He is killed in an ambush while attempting to launch a sneak attack on the Liangshan camp.
 Zeng Kui is Zeng Nong's fourth son. He is killed by Lu Zhishen and Wu Song when the outlaws overrun the fortress.
 Zeng Sheng is Zeng Nong's youngest son. He is sent as a hostage to the Liangshan camp during the negotiations for a truce between Liangshan and the Zengs. He is eventually executed by the outlaws.
 Shi Wengong is Zeng Nong's adviser and the martial arts instructor in the fortress. A highly skilled warrior capable of fighting several opponents at the same time, he kills Liangshan's chief Chao Gai with a poisoned arrow in an earlier battle. Before dying, Chao Gai says that whoever captures Shi Wengong will succeed him as chief. When the Liangshan outlaws overrun the fortress, Shi Wengong attempts to flee but encounters Lu Junyi, who defeats and captures him. Shi Wengong is then escorted back to Liangshan and executed as a sacrifice to Chao Gai. Some non-Water Margin sources claim that he is a martial arts apprentice of Zhou Tong.
 Su Ding is the deputy martial arts instructor in the fortress. He is killed in battle when the Liangshan outlaws overrun the fortress.

Gao Qiu's story
 Gao Qiu is one of the primary antagonists in the novel. Originally a hooligan living on the streets of Dongjing (東京; present-day Kaifeng, Henan), he meets Prince Duan by chance and impresses the prince with his talent in the ball game qiqiu. Through their common hobby, Gao Qiu develops a close relationship with Prince Duan and eventually gets appointed as a Grand Marshal when Prince Duan becomes emperor. After entering office, Gao Qiu abuses his powers by taking revenge against those who previously offended him and persecuting innocents. Some of the 108 Stars of Destiny – most notably Lin Chong – have suffered some form of injustice at Gao Qiu's hands. Gao Qiu also urges Emperor Huizong to send imperial forces to eliminate the Liangshan outlaws on four separate occasions. However, the outlaws emerge victorious every time, and some of the imperial commanders (e.g. Huyan Zhuo, Guan Sheng) decide to join the outlaws in opposing the corrupt Song government. When Gao Qiu personally leads imperial forces to attack the outlaws, he suffers a devastating defeat in the marshes and ends up being captured. While Lin Chong and some of the outlaws want to kill Gao Qiu in revenge, Song Jiang stops them because he wants Gao Qiu to help the outlaws convey to Emperor Huizong their desire for to be granted amnesty and opportunities to serve the Song Empire. Gao Qiu pretends to agree, and breaks his promise as soon as the outlaws release him. Despite Gao Qiu and other corrupt officials' attempts to stop them, the outlaws eventually secure amnesty from Emperor Huizong and go on military campaigns against the Liao Empire and rebel forces on Song territory as a form of service to the Song Empire. After the campaigns, Emperor Huizong confers official appointments on the surviving Liangshan heroes to honour them for their service. Gao Qiu and the other corrupt officials were dissatisfied with the outcome so they conspire to murder Song Jiang and Lu Junyi.
 Wang Shen is a prince consort who married Emperor Zhezong's sister. He is referred to as Wang Jinqing in the novel. Before Gao Qiu rose to power, he was briefly a servant in Wang Jinqing's residence. When Wang Jinqing once tasked him with sending gifts to Prince Duan, Gao Qiu interrupted the prince's qiqiu game by coincidence. The prince is so impressed with Gao Qiu's skill that he asks Wang Jinqing to allow Gao Qiu to serve under him.
 "Little Su the Scholar" is an imperial academic who recommended Gao Qiu to Wang Shen. His true identity is not specified. He is believed to be Su Shi (Su Dongpo) or a member of Su Shi's family.
 Liu Shiquan is a man who runs a gambling house. He likes to accept idlers and provide them with food and lodging. He lets Gao Qiu stay with him when Gao Qiu was still wandering the streets. He later sends Gao Qiu to his relative, Dong Jiangshi.
 Dong Jiangshi is Liu Shiquan's relative, who runs a pharmacy near the Jinliang Bridge in Dongjing (present-day Kaifeng). He accepts Gao Qiu and lets the latter stay with him for a while, but does not really like him. He is afraid that Gao Qiu might have a negative influence on his children so he sends Gao Qiu away to Su Shi's residence.

Song government
 Emperor Huizong, personal name Zhao Ji, is the ruler of the Song Empire. He was previously known as Prince Duan before he became emperor.
 Cai Jing is the Imperial Tutor in Emperor Huizong's court. A corrupt official, he collaborates with Gao Qiu, Tong Guan, Yang Jian and others to block the Liangshan outlaws' attempt to obtain amnesty from Emperor Huizong. However, their attempt fails and the outlaws receive amnesty and go on military campaigns as a form of service to the Song Empire. Later, he conspires with Gao Qiu and the others to murder Song Jiang and Lu Junyi. Apart from characterising Cai Jing as a villain, the novel also names  Cai Jing as one of the best calligraphers of his time alongside Su Shi (Su Dongpo), Huang Tingjian and Mi Fu. In one chapter, the Liangshan outlaws recruit Xiao Rang, who is known for his ability to imitate the works of the four calligraphers, to forge a letter in Cai Jing's handwriting.
 Tong Guan is a eunuch serving as a Privy Councillor in Emperor Huizong's court. A corrupt official who rose to power because the emperor favoured him, he conspires with Gao Qiu and the others to murder Song Jiang and Lu Junyi.
 Yang Jian is a eunuch serving as a Grand Marshal in Emperor Huizong's court. A corrupt official who rose to power because the emperor favoured him, he conspires with Gao Qiu and the others to murder Song Jiang and Lu Junyi.
 Su Yuanjing is a Grand Marshal in Emperor Huizong's court. He is known to be an honest official. Song Jiang wishes to convey his and the Liangshan heroes' grievances of being forced to become outlaws due to corruption in the government, as well as express their desire to serve the Song Empire. After Song Jiang approaches Su Yuanjing for help, the latter manages to convince Emperor Huizong to grant the outlaws amnesty. He also speaks up for the Liangshan heroes in front of the emperor on several occasions. He is sent by the emperor to grant amnesty to the outlaws again after the first attempt by Chen Zongshan failed.
 Chen Zongshan is a Grand Marshal sent by Emperor Huizong to grant amnesty to the Liangshan outlaws the first time. However, his mission fails because the majority of the outlaws are reluctant to accept amnesty, and the impulsive Li Kui tears up the emperor's imperial decree.
 Liu Menglong is a military officer who specialises in naval warfare. He is appointed by Gao Qiu to lead the imperial navy to attack Liangshan Marsh. His complacency results in him falling into an ambush in the marsh, where his entire fleet is destroyed and he is captured by the outlaws. He is sent back to Gao Qiu after his defeat and promptly executed for his failure.

Liao Empire
 Yelü Hui, referred to in the novel as the "Ruler of Liao", is the ruler of the Liao Empire. After being defeated in battle by the Liangshan forces, he surrenders and agrees to pay annual tribute to the Song Empire.
 Chu Jian is the Right Premier and Royal Adviser of the Liao Empire. He represents the Liao Empire in surrendering to the Song Empire.
 Youxi Bojin is the Left Premier of the Liao Empire.
 Yelü Guozhen is Yelü Hui's nephew. He is killed by Dong Ping.
 Yelü Guobao is Yelü Guozhen's younger brother. He falls off horseback after being hit in the face with a stone flung by Zhang Qing, and gets killed by Liangshan forces.
 Taizhen Xuqing is Yelü Hui's son-in-law. He flees from battle after Wuyan Yanshou is captured and Li Ji is killed.
 Li Ji, also referred to as "Li Jinyu", is the zhi jinyu (security chief of the capital) of the Liao Empire and a descendant of Li Ling. He is killed by Qin Ming.
 Vice-Minister Ouyang is sent by Yelü Hui to persuade Song Jiang and the Liangshan heroes to surrender and defect to the Liao Empire. Song Jiang pretends to agree; the Liangshan forces then easily take control of Bazhou.

"11 Star Generals"
The "11 Star Generals" are a military configuration based on the Nine Astronomical Bodies.
 Yelü Dezhòng, representing the "Taiyang Star" is Yelü Hui's younger brother. He is in charge of guarding Jizhou (present-day Ji County, Tianjin). He is killed by Wu Song.
 Dalibo, also known as Princess Tianshou, represents the "Taiyin Star". She is captured by Wang Ying during the final battle, and later released after the Liao Empire's surrender.
 Yelü Derong, representing the "Rahu Star", is a nephew of Yelü Hui. He is killed in battle by Liangshan forces.
 Yelü Dehua, representing the "Ketu Star", is a nephew of Yelü Hui. He is captured by Lu Junyi.
 Yelü Dezhōng, representing the "Purple Star", is a nephew of Yelü Hui. He flees when the Liangshan forces defeat the Liao forces in battle.
 Yelü Dexin, representing the "Moon Star", is a nephew of Yelü Hui. He is killed in battle by Liangshan forces.
 Zhi'er Fulang represents the "Water Star of the East".
 Wuli Ke'an represents the "Gold Star of the West".
 Dongxian Wenrong, also known as Vice-Minister Dongxian, represents the "Fire Star of the South". He is in charge of guarding Tanzhou (around present-day Kangping County, Liaoning).
 Quli Chuqing represents the "Water Star of the North". He is captured by Zhu Tong.
 Wuyan Guang, representing the "Earth Star of the Centre", is a field marshal of the Liao army. He is killed in battle by Guan Sheng and Zhang Qing.
 Wuyan Yanshou is Wuyan Guang's eldest son. He is captured by Huyan Zhuo.
 Qiongyao Nayan is hit in the face by an arrow fired by Hua Rong, and killed by Shi Jin.
 Koushuang Zhenyuan is killed by Sun Li.

"28 Mansions Generals"
The "28 Mansions Generals" are a military configuration based on the 28 Mansions.

 Sun Zhong represents the Wood Dragon of Horn.
 Zhang Qi represents the Gold Dragon of Neck.
 Liu Ren represents the Earth Badger of Root.
 Xie Wu represents the Sun Rabbit of Room.
 Pei Zhi represents the Moon Fox of Heart. He is captured by Yang Lin and Chen Da.
 Gu Yongxing represents the Fire Tiger of Tail.
 Jia Mao represents the Water Leopard of Winnowing Basket.
 Xiao Daguan represents the Wood Insect of Dipper. He is captured by Ou Peng, Deng Fei and Ma Lin.
 Xue Xiong represents the Gold Bull of Ox.
 Yu Decheng represents the Earth Bat of Girl.
 Xu Wei represents the Sun Rat of Emptiness.
 Li Yi represents the Moon Swallow of Rooftop.
 Zu Xing represents the Fire Pig of Encampment.
 Chengzhu Nahai represents the Water Pangolin of Wall.
 Guo Yongchang represents the Wood Wolf of Legs.
 Aliyi represents the Gold Dog of Bond.
 Gao Biao represents the Earth Pheasant of Stomach. He is captured by Shan Tinggui and Wei Dingguo.
 Shun Shougao represents the Sun Rooster of Hairy Head.
 Guo Yongtai represents the Moon Bird of Net.
 Pan Yi represents the Fire Monkey of Turtle Beak.
 Zhou Bao represents the Water Ape of Three Stars.
 Tong Lihe represents the Wood Dog of Well.
 Wang Jing represents the Gold Sheep of Ghost.
 Lei Chun represents the Earth Deer of Willow. He is captured by Han Tao and Peng Qi.
 Ka Junbao represents the Sun Horse of Star.
 Li Fu represents the Moon Deer of Extended Net.
 Di Sheng represents the Fire Serpent of Wings. He is captured by Han Tao and Peng Qi.
 Bangu'er represents the Water Earthworm of Chariot.

Youzhou
 He Chongbao is in charge of guarding Youzhou (幽州; around present-day Beijing). He is well-versed in sorcery but is no match for Gongsun Sheng. He is dismounted from his horse by Huang Xin, cornered by Yang Xiong, Shi Xiu and Song Wan, and eventually killed by Liangshan infantry.
 He Zhe is He Chongbao's brother. He is killed by Lin Chong.
 He Yun is He Chongbao's brother. He is killed by Li Kui.

Bazhou
 Kangli Anding is Yelü Hui's brother-in-law. He is in charge of guarding Bazhou.
 Vice-Minister Jin Fu
 Vice-Minister Ye Qing

Jizhou
 Yelü Zongyun is Yelü Dezhòng's first son.
 Yelü Zongdian is Yelü Dezhòng's second son.
 Yelü Zonglei is Yelü Dezhòng's third son.
 Yelü Zonglin is Yelü Dezhòng's fourth son. He is killed by Lu Junyi.
 Baomisheng is killed by Lin Chong.
 Tianshanyong fires a crossbow bolt that injures Zhang Qing in the neck. He is killed by Xu Ning.

Tanzhou
 Aliqi defeats Xu Ning in a duel and pursues him. He is later injured by Zhang Qing, captured by Liangshan forces, and subsequently dies of his wound.
 Yao'er Weikang is killed by Suo Chao.
 Chu Mingyu is killed by Shi Jin.
 Cao Mingji is killed by Shi Jin.

Tian Hu forces
 Tian Hu, the self-declared "King of Jin", is a rebel leader who establishes an independent kingdom in the Shanxi region with its base in Weisheng Prefecture (around present-day southeast Shanxi). He is ultimately defeated by the Liangshan forces fighting for the Song Empire, and captured by Zhang Qing.
 Tian Ding is Tian Hu's son and heir apparent. He commits suicide after the Liangshan forces capture Weisheng Prefecture.
 Lady Wu is Wu Li's sister and Tian Hu's concubine.
 Lady Fan is Fan Quan's daughter and Tian Hu's concubine.

Weisheng Prefecture
 Fan Quan is Lady Fan's father.
 Li Tianxi
 Zheng Zhirui is defeated by the defectors Sun An and Ma Ling.
 Xue Shi
 Lin Xin
 Hu Ying is killed in battle.
 Tang Chang is killed by Zhang Qing.

Fenyang Prefecture
 Tian Bao is Tian Hu's second brother. He is in charge of guarding Fenyang Prefecture. After Tian Hu's defeat, he is captured by the Liangshan forces and subsequently executed.
 Tian Shi is Tian Biao's son and Tian Hu's nephew.
 Suo Xian is killed in battle.
 Dang Shilong is killed in battle.
 Ling Guang is killed in battle.
 Duan Ren
 Miao Cheng
 Chen Xuan
 Ma Ling, nicknamed "Divine Horse" and "Little Hua Guang", is one of Tian Hu's top warriors. He is also well-versed in Taoist magic. After Tian Hu's defeat, Ma Ling surrenders to the Liangshan forces and eventually chooses to spend the rest of his life studying Taoism under Taoist Luo's tutelage.
 Wu Neng
 Xu Jin is killed by Hao Siwen.

Jinning Prefecture
 Tian Biao is Tian Hu's third brother. He is in charge of guarding Jinning Prefecture (晉寧府; in present-day Shanxi). After Tian Hu's defeat, he is captured by the Liangshan forces and subsequently executed.
 Wang Yuan
 Yao Yue is killed by Deng Fei.
 Sun An surrenders and joins the Liangshan forces after he is captured by Lu Junyi. Apart from helping the Liangshan forces to defeat Tian Hu, he also convinces Qiao Daoqing, who is from the same hometown as him, to surrender and join Liangshan. He follows the Liangshan heroes on their campaign against Wang Qing. In one battle, he assists Lu Junyi in defeating an enemy officer, Du Xue. He dies of illness shortly after the battle.
 Mei Yu surrenders to the Liangshan forces.
 Qin Ying is killed by Yang Zhi.
 Jin Zhen surrenders to the Liangshan forces.
 Lu Qing is killed by Ou Peng.
 Bi Jie surrenders to the Liangshan forces.
 Pan Xun surrenders to the Liangshan forces.
 Yang Fang surrenders to the Liangshan forces.
 Feng Sheng surrenders to the Liangshan forces.
 Hu Mai surrenders to the Liangshan forces.
 Lu Fang

Gaizhou
 Niu Wenzhong is the head of the privy council of Tian Hu's kingdom. He is tasked with overseeing the defence of Gaizhou (蓋州; present-day Jincheng, Shanxi) along with 30,000 troops. Under his command, he has four lieutenants called the "Four Might Generals" (四威將), who each has four subordinates. He is killed by Lu Zhishen while attempting to escape when Gaizhou falls to the Liangshan forces.
 Fang Qiong, titled "Suanni's Might General", is wounded by an arrow shot from Hua Rong and eventually killed by Sun Li.
 Yang Duan is killed by Hua Rong.
 Guo Xin is killed by Li Kui.
 Su Ji
 Zhang Xiang is killed by Hua Rong.
 An Shirong, titled "Pixiu's Might General", is killed by Xu Ning.
 Fang Shun surrenders to the Liangshan forces.
 Shen An is killed by Wu Song.
 Lu Yuan
 Wang Ji is killed by Wang Ying.
 Chu Heng, titled "Tiger Cub's Might General", is killed by Xie Zhen and Xie Bao.
 Shi Jing is killed in battle.
 Qin Sheng is killed in battle.
 Mo Zhen is killed in battle.
 Sheng Ben is killed by Wang Ying and Hu Sanniang.
 Yu Yulin, titled "Bear's Might General", escapes after the fall of Gaizhou.
 He Ren is killed in battle.
 Cao Hong is killed in battle.
 Shi Xun is killed in battle.
 Sang Ying is killed by Li Kui.

Zhaode Prefecture
 Sun Qi is killed by Zhang Qing.
 Ye Sheng is killed by Jin Ding and Huang Yue during the mutiny.
 Jin Ding starts a mutiny in Zhaode Prefecture, kills three of Tian Hu's officers, and defects to the Liangshan forces. He later joins the Liangshan heroes on their campaign against Wang Qing. He is killed by Yuan Lang, an enemy officer.
 Huang Yue joins Jin Ding in the mutiny and surrenders to the Liangshan forces. He follows the Liangshan heroes on their campaign against Wang Qing, and is also killed by Yuan Lang.
 Leng Ning is killed by Jin Ding and Huang Yue during the mutiny.
 Dai Mei is killed by Suo Chao.
 Weng Kui surrenders to the Liangshan forces.
 Yang Chun surrenders to the Liangshan forces.
 Niu Geng is killed by Jin Ding and Huang Yue during the mutiny.
 Cai Ze surrenders to the Liangshan forces.
 Qiao Lie, better known as Qiao Daoqing, is a Taoist magician serving as the Royal Adviser and Left Premier of Tian Hu's kingdom. After Sun An convinces him to surrender and join the Liangshan forces, he does so and becomes Gongsun Sheng's apprentice. He also accompanies the Liangshan heroes on their campaign against Wang Qing. After the Liangshan heroes emerge victorious, Qiao Daoqing leaves them and spends the rest of his life studying Taoism under Taoist Luo's tutelage.
 Nie Xin is knocked off horseback by Xu Ning and trampled to death in the midst of battle.
 Feng Qi is killed in battle.
 Lei Zhen is killed by Tang Long.
 Ni Lin is killed by Lin Chong.
 Fei Zhen is Qiao Daoqing's subordinate.
 Xue Can surrenders to the Liangshan forces.

Xiangyuan County
 Xu Wei is in charge of guarding Xiangyuan County. He is killed by Qiongying and Zhang Qing.
 Ye Qing surrenders to the Liangshan forces.
 Tang Xian is killed by the defector Sun An.
 Wu Li is Tian Hu's brother-in-law. He is killed by Qiongying and Zhang Qing.
 Qiongying is Wu Li's stepdaughter. After learning a "flying stones" technique from a divine warrior in a mystical dream, she has been wanting to find that warrior and marry him. In the initial battles against the Liangshan forces, she uses the "flying stones" technique to defeat Wang Ying, Hu Sanniang and Sun Xin, and even manages to force Lin Chong to retreat. Later, she encounters Zhang Qing, who is on an espionage mission, and recognises him as the divine warrior in her dream. They fall in love and get married. After Zhang Qing reveals his true identity as a Liangshan spy, Qiongying tells him that she has all along been secretly plotting revenge against Tian Hu, who murdered her parents. Qiongying and Zhang Qing then work together to kill Wu Li and his men, and assist the Liangshan forces in defeating Tian Hu. She bears Zhang Qing a son, Zhang Jie, who follows in his father's footsteps by serving the Song Empire and fighting in the Jin–Song Wars.

Lingchuan County
 Dong Cheng is in charge of guarding Lingchuan County. He duels with Zhu Tong and Hua Rong, and is killed by an arrow fired by Hua Rong.
 Shen Ji joins Dong Cheng in duelling Hua Rong. He is killed by Dong Ping.
 Geng Gong surrenders and joins the Liangshan forces after he is captured by Bao Xu.

Gaoping County
 Zhang Li leads 20,000 troops to guard Gaoping County. He is killed by Li Kui while attempting to escape after the Liangshan forces capture Gaoping County.
 Zhao Neng is killed in battle.

Yangcheng County
 Kou Fu is in charge of guarding Yangcheng County. He is captured by civilians and handed over to the Liangshan forces, and subsequently executed.

Qinshui County
 Chen Kai is in charge of guarding Qinshui County. He is captured by civilians and handed over to the Liangshan forces, and subsequently executed.

Lucheng County
 Chi Fang is in charge of guarding Lucheng County (in present-day southeastern Shanxi). He is killed by Xu Ning.

Qinyuan County
 Bian Xiang is the Right Premier of Tian Hu's kingdom and one of Tian Hu's top warriors. He reaches a draw in a duel against both Shi Jin and Hua Rong at the same time. He surrenders and joins the Liangshan forces after being captured in battle by Lu Junyi, and joins the Liangshan heroes on their campaign against Wang Qing. During the campaign, he kills Feng Tai and meets his end at the hands of Kou Mie.
 Fan Yuming is killed by Dong Ping.
 Yu Deyuan is killed in battle.
 Fu Xiang surrenders and joins the Liangshan forces after being captured by Lü Fang and Guo Sheng. He joins the Liangshan heroes on their campaign against Wang Qing and dies in battle.
 Gu Kai is killed by Lin Chong.
 Kou Chen
 Guan Yan
 Feng Yi is killed by Hua Rong.
 Lü Zhen
 Ji Wenbing
 An Shilong

Taiyuan County
 Xiang Zhong is in charge of guarding Taiyuan County. He is captured and executed by the Liangshan forces.
 Zhang Xiong is killed by Zhang Heng and Zhang Shun.
 Xu Yue is captured and executed by the Liangshan forces.

Yushe County
 Fang Xuedu is the officer guarding Yushe County. He is killed in battle by Guan Sheng, Suo Chao and Tang Long.

Mount Baodu
 Tang Bin is in charge of guarding Mount Baodu (located west of present-day Luquan District, Shijiazhuang, Hebei). He surrenders and joins the Liangshan forces, and later follows them on their campaign against Wang Qing. He is killed by Mi Sheng.
 Wen Zhongrong also surrenders and joins Liangshan, and participates in the campaign against Wang Qing. He is killed by Mi Sheng.
 Cui Ye also surrenders and joins Liangshan, and participates in the campaign against Wang Qing. He is killed by Mi Sheng.

Hu Pass
 Shan Shiqi is in charge of guarding Hu Pass (in present-day Huguan County, Shanxi). He duels with Lin Chong and reaches a draw with his opponent. After Hu Pass falls to the Liangshan forces, he surrenders and later joins the Liangshan heroes on their campaign against Wang Qing. He is killed by Feng Tai.
 Lu Hui
 Shi Ding is killed by Xu Ning.
 Wu Cheng is killed by Suo Chao.
 Zhong Liang is killed in battle.
 Yun Zongwu
 Wu Su is killed by Lin Chong.
 Zhu Jing is killed by the defector Tang Bin.

Wang Qing forces

Wang family
 Wang Qing, the self-declared "King of Chu", is a rebel leader who establishes an independent kingdom covering parts of Hubei, Chongqing and Sichuan, with its base in Nanfeng (around present-day Danjiangkou, Hubei). He is ultimately defeated by the Liangshan forces fighting for the Song Empire, and captured by Li Jun. After his defeat, he is charged with treason and publicly executed by lingchi.
 Duan Sanniang is Wang Qing's wife and the queen of his kingdom. Notorious for her rough and violent ways, she murdered her first husband, whom she was forced to marry when she was 15. She and her brothers used to lead a bandit gang in Fangzhou before she met Wang Qing, fell in love with him, and married him. In the final battle, she is captured by the Liangshan forces after being struck in the face by Qiongying's "flying stones", and eventually executed along with Wang Qing.

Nanfeng
 Li Zhu, nicknamed "Mr. Golden Sword", is Wang Qing's chief strategist and the Premier of his kingdom. Well-trained in Taoist magic, he can use his powers to control his sword and attack enemies at lightning-fast speed. He is eventually defeated by Gongsun Sheng and captured by Lu Junyi.
 Liu Yijing is the vanguard commander in the final battle. He is killed by Liangshan forces shortly after being dismounted by Jiao Ting.
 Shangguan Yi is the deputy vanguard commander in the final battle. He is killed by Liangshan forces.
 Liu Yuan covers the right flank in the final battle. He is killed by Lin Chong in a duel that lasted over 50 rounds.
 Pan Zhong also covers the right flank in the final battle. He is killed by Huang Xin shortly after coming to Liu Yuan's aid in his duel against Lin Chong. 
 Li Xiong covers the left flank in the final battle. He is killed by Qiongying.
 Bi Xian also covers the left flank in the final battle. He is killed by Wang Dingliu.
 Duan Wu is Duan Sanniang's younger brother. He leads the rear guard in the final battle, and is killed by Yang Xiong.
 Qiu Xiang serves as the deputy rear guard commander in the final battle. He is killed by Shi Xiu.
 Fang Han is the head of the privy council of Wang Qing's kingdom. He commands the central flank in the final battle, and meets his end at the hands of Lu Junyi.
 Fan Quan is Wang Qing's maternal cousin. He serves as a commander under Wang Qing and dies during the final battle.
 Xie Ning is captured by the Liangshan forces while leading reinforcements from Nanfeng to Jingnan.

Mount Yique
 Du Xue engages Lu Junyi in a one-on-one duel at the battle of Mount Yique (south of present-day Luoyang, Henan). After some 50 rounds, neither Du Xue nor Lu Junyi has managed to overcome his opponent. When Sun An comes to Lu Junyi's aid, Zhuo Mao tries to intercept Sun An but ends up being killed. When Du Xue is distracted by Zhuo Mao's death, Sun An cuts off Du Xue's right arm and Lu Junyi seizes the opportunity to finish him off. 
 Feng Tai kills Shan Shiqi to avenge Wei He. He is later killed by Bian Xiang.
 Wei He is killed in a duel against Shan Shiqi.

Mount Ji
 Li Rang is Li Zhu's nephew. Like his uncle, he serves under Wang Qing and takes charge of guarding the areas around Mount Ji (south of present-day Shayang County, Hubei). Under his command, he has the "Five Tigers of Mount Ji". He is killed by Lu Zhishen when the Liangshan forces overrun his base on the mountain.
 Yuan Lang, kills Jin Ding and Huang Yue. Later, he duels with Qin Ming and Qiongying until the Liangshan forces launch their all-out assault on Mount Ji. He is killed by cannon fire during the battle.
 Ma Jiangassists Mi Sheng in killing Tang Bin. He is killed by Xiao Jiasui later.
 Ma Jinis Ma Jiang's brother. He is killed in battle.
 Teng Kui, is killed by Qiongying in a duel.
 Teng Kan, is Teng Kui's younger brother. He reaches a draw in a duel against Huyan Zhuo after more than 50 rounds. He is later killed in battle.
 Xi Sheng deploys his troops in the Liuhua Formation against the Liangshan forces. Under Zhu Wu's direction, the Liangshan forces break the formation and kill Xi Sheng in battle.

Shannan Prefecture
 Duan Er is Duan Sanniang's elder brother. He is in charge of guarding Shannan Prefecture (present-day Xiangyang, Hubei.) He is captured by the Liangshan forces and subsequently executed.
 Zuo Mou is Duan Er's adviser. He is killed in battle by Liangshan forces.
 Que Zhu is killed by Hua Rong and Lin Chong at Wanzhou.
 Weng Fei is killed by Hua Rong and Lin Chong at Wanzhou.
 Zhu Neng is a naval officer serving in Shannan. Acting on Duan Er's order, he attempts to attack the Liangshan supply boats but falls into an ambush and gets killed by Tong Wei.
 Xue Zan is killed at the battle of Longzhong.
 Geng Wen is killed at the battle of Longzhong.
 Qian Bin is killed by Bian Xiang.
 Qian Yi is knocked off horseback by Ma Ling and trampled to death in the midst of battle.
 Ji Sansi is killed in battle while attempting to recapture Wanzhou from the Liangshan forces.
 Ni She is in charge of guarding Gongzhou. He is killed in battle while attempting to recapture Wanzhou from the Liangshan forces.
 Wu Shun is in charge of guarding Baofeng. He surrenders to the Liangshan forces.
 Mi Sheng kills Wen Zhongrong and Cui Ye, and reaches a draw in a duel against Suo Chao. With Ma Jiang's help, he kills Tang Bin and captures Pei Xuan, Xiao Rang and Jin Dajian, and hands the three captives over to Liang Yong in Jingnan. He is killed by cannon fire after falling into a trap set by Chai Jin.
 He Ji is killed by Sun An in a duel.
 Guo Gan is killed by Tang Bin after being hit in the nose by a "flying stone" from Qiongying.
 Chen Yun is killed by Qin Ming and Qiongying.

Jingnan Prefecture
 Liang Yong is in charge of guarding Jingnan Prefecture (around present-day Jingzhou, Hubei). He is killed by Xiao Jiasui, who lead the citizens of Jingnan to rise up against Wang Qing's forces and assist the Liangshan forces in retaking Jingnan for the Song Empire.

Wanzhou
 Liu Min, nicknamed "Liu Zhibo", is in charge of guarding Wanzhou (present-day Nanyang, Henan). He is captured and executed by the Liangshan forces after the fall of Wanzhou.
 Lu Cheng is killed by Sun An.
 Zheng Jie is killed by Qiongying and Zhang Qing.
 Gu Cen is killed by Bian Xiang.
 Han Zhe
 Kou Meng
 Zhang Shou is in charge of guarding Ruzhou. He is killed by Lin Chong while leading reinforcements to Wanzhou.
 Bo Ren is in charge of guarding Anchang County (southeast of present-day Zaoyang, Hubei). He is captured by Guan Sheng while leading reinforcements to Wanzhou, and subsequently executed.
 Zhang Qia is in charge of guarding Yiyang County (in present-day Hubei). He is captured by Guan Sheng while leading reinforcements to Wanzhou, and subsequently executed.

Xijing
 Gong Duan is in charge of guarding Xijing (present-day Luoyang, Henan). He is killed in battle by the Liangshan forces.
 Gong Zheng is Gong Duan's younger brother. The Gong brothers previously learnt martial arts from Wang Qing, and later pledged their support to him when he started his rebellion and declared himself "King of Chu".
 Zhuo Mao is killed by Sun An during the battle of Longmen Gate in Xijing.
 Kou Mie, nicknamed "Toxic Flames Devil King", is a Taoist sorcerer who specialises in conjuring magical flames to burn his enemies. He kills Bian Xiang during the battle of Longmen Gate. Later, he is defeated and killed by Qiao Daoqing.

Dongchuan, Yun'an and Ande prefectures
 Shi Jun is a relative of Duan Sanniang. He is in charge of guarding Yun'an Prefecture (present-day eastern Chongqing), and is killed by Li Jun in battle.
 Wenren Shichong is a naval officer serving under Wang Qing. He is defeated and killed by Liangshan forces under Li Jun during the battle of Qutang Gorge.
 Hu Jun is captured by Li Jun during the battle of Qutang Gorge. Impressed by Li Jun's generosity towards him, he surrenders to the Liangshan forces and assists them in taking Wang Qing's territories in Dongchuan and Ande.
 Hu Xian is Hu Jun's younger brother. He is in charge of guarding Dongchuan (around present-day Mianyang, Sichuan). After Hu Jun surrenders to the Liangshan forces, he comes to Dongchuan and convinces his brother to surrender as well.

Others
 Liao Li is the leader of an outlaw gang in Fangzhou (present-day Fang County, Hubei). Before Wang Qing started his rebellion, he led his followers to take shelter under Liao Li. However, Liao Li refuses to accept them because he is afraid that Wang Qing will usurp his leadership position. Liao Li is eventually killed by Wang Qing and Duan Sanniang.
 Xiao Jiasui is a descendant of Xiao Dan, a half-brother of Xiao Yan, the founding emperor of the Liang dynasty. A commoner living in Jingnan, he remains loyal to the Song Empire even after the city falls to Wang Qing's rebel forces. Later, he rallies his fellow citizens to rise up against the rebels and help the Liangshan forces retake Jingnan for the Song Empire.

Fang La forces

Fang family
 Fang La is a rebel leader who establishes an independent kingdom in the Jiangnan region with himself as the ruler. He is captured by Lu Zhishen in the final battle. After his capture, he is sent to Dongjing (present-day Kaifeng, Henan), where he is subsequently charged with treason and publicly executed by lingchi.
 Fang Tianding is Fang La's son and heir apparent. He captures and executes Hao Siwen, while his archers kill Xu Ning and Zhang Shun. He is killed by Zhang Heng, who has been possessed by Zhang Shun's spirit.
 Fang Jinzhi is Fang La's daughter. She marries Ke Yin (Chai Jin's undercover identity) without knowing that he is actually with the Liangshan forces. When the Liangshan forces occupy Fang La's palace after the final battle, she commits suicide by hanging herself.
 Fang Mao is Fang La's third brother. He oversees the defence of Suzhou and has the "Eight Valiant Riders" serving under his command. He is killed by Wu Song when Suzhou falls.
 Fang Hou is Fang La's uncle. He is in charge of guarding Shezhou. He is killed by Lu Junyi when Shezhou falls.
 Fang Jie is Fang Hou's grandson. With Du Wei's help, he kills Qin Ming in a duel, and later meets his end at the hands of Chai Jin and Yan Qing.

Central government
 Lou Minzhong is the Left Premier of Fang La's kingdom. He unsuspectingly recommends the disguised Chai Jin, Yan Qing and Ruan Xiaowu to serve under Fang La. Later, he discovers that Ruan Xiaowu is a Liangshan spy and executes him. When the Liangshan forces overrun Qingxi County, he commits suicide to avoid being captured.
 Zu Shiyuan is the Right Premier of Fang La's kingdom. He is captured by the Liangshan forces when Muzhou falls.
 Wang Yin is the Secretary of Military Affairs in Fang La's kingdom. Well-versed in both scholarly and military arts, he fights well with a spear and rides a powerful stallion named Zhuanshanfei. Apart from luring Shan Tinggui and Wei Dingguo into a fatal trap, he also kills Shi Yong and Li Yun. While attempting to flee during the fall of Shezhou, he gets cornered and killed by Lin Chong, Sun Li, Huang Xin, Zou Yuan and Zou Run.
 Bao Daoyi, also known as "Lingying Heavenly Master", is an unorthodox Taoist sorcerer serving under Fang La. During the battle of Muzhou, he uses his powers to control a sword and slice off Wu Song's left arm. He is later blasted into bits by cannon fire from Ling Zhen.
 Zheng Biao, also known as "Demon Lord Zheng", is Bao Daoyi's apprentice and the Palace Commandant of Fang La's kingdom. He kills Wang Ying and Hu Sanniang, and later meets his end at the hands of Guan Sheng.
 Lü Shinang oversees the defence of Runzhou along with his subordinates, the "12 Deities of Jiangnan". He is killed by Xu Ning in Wuxi.
 Du Wei is a former blacksmith who specialises in throwing daggers. He kills Yu Baosi and Sun Erniang, and indirectly causes Qin Ming's death. Following the Liangshan victory, Du Wei attempts to hide among the civilians but they capture him and hand him over to the Liangshan forces, who execute him to appease the Liangshan heroes he killed.
 Tan Gao is Zu Shiyuan's subordinate. He is killed by Zhu Tong when the Liangshan forces overrun Muzhou.
 Gao Yu is killed by Huyan Zhuo while attempting to launch a sneak attack on the Liangshan camp during the battle of Shezhou.
 Pu Wenying is Fang La's royal astronomer. He is killed by Bao Daoyi when he attempts to urge the sorcerer to avoid battle because of an unlucky omen in the stars.
 Xing Zheng is the commander of Fang La's forces in Suzhou. He is killed by Guan Sheng in Runzhou.
 He Conglong is captured by Lu Junyi.
 Shen Shou
 Huan Yi
 Feng Xi
 Wei Zhong

"Four Great Marshals"
The "Four Great Marshals" are four generals serving under Fang Tianding in Hangzhou.

 Deng Yuanjue, nicknamed "Buddha of Holy Light", is a Buddhist monk who serves as Fang La's Royal Adviser. His combat skills are on par with Lu Zhishen. He is killed by Liangshan forces after being wounded by an arrow fired by Hua Rong.
 Si Xingfang, titled "Great General Who Defends the Kingdom", leads reinforcements to Deqing County. He kills Lei Heng in a duel. After the fall of Deqing County, he falls into the river while attempting to escape and eventually drowns.
 Li Tianrun, titled "Great General Who Guards the Kingdom", leads reinforcements to Dusong Pass. He kills Zhou Tong and Zhang Qing, and eventually meets his end at the hands of Lu Junyi.
 Shi Bao, titled "Great General of the South", is one of Fang La's top warriors. Throughout the campaign, he single-handedly kills five Liangshan heroes – Suo Chao, Deng Fei, Yan Shun, Bao Xu and Ma Lin – and even manages to reach a draw in a duel against Guan Sheng. He eventually commits suicide to avoid being taken captive when the Liangshan forces defeat Fang La in the final battle.

"24 Officers of Hangzhou"
The "24 Officers of Hangzhou" are 24 officers serving under Fang Tianding in Hangzhou.

 Xue Dounan flees after his defeat and goes missing.
 Huang Ai lures Gong Wang into a fatal ambush. He is captured by Huyan Zhuo later.
 Xu Bai is captured by Huyan Zhuo.
 Mi Quan is killed by Suo Chao.
 Li Tianyou is killed by Lü Fang.
 Zhang Jian is captured by Xie Zhen and Xie Bao.
 Zhang Tao kills Dong Ping. He is later captured by Xie Zhen and Xie Bao.
 Yao Yi is killed in battle.
 Wen Kerang is captured by Wang Ying and Hu Sanniang.
 Zhao Yi is killed by Li Kui.
 Leng Gong is killed by Lin Chong.
 Wang Ren is killed by Hua Rong.
 Zhang Daoyuan is captured by Gu Dasao, Sun Erniang and Hu Sanniang, and later executed.
 Wu Zhi is captured by Li Jun and Shi Xiu.
 Lian Ming is killed by Bao Xu.
 Feng Yi is killed by Qin Ming.
 Chao Zhong is killed by Hua Rong.
 Cui Yu is killed by Xie Zhen and Xie Bao.
 Wang Ji is killed by Hua Rong.
 Su Jing is killed by Bao Xu.
 Mao Di is captured alive by Ruan Xiaoer, Ruan Xiaowu and Meng Kang, and later executed.
 Tang Fengshi is killed in battle.
 Yuan Xing is killed by Xiang Chong and Li Gun.
 Bei Yingkui is killed by Wu Song.

"Eight Valiant Riders"
The "Eight Valiant Riders" are eight warriors serving under Fang Mao in Suzhou.

 Liu Yun, titled "Flying Dragon Great General", duels with Guan Sheng and reaches a draw with his opponent. He escapes to Xiuzhou after Suzhou falls to the Liangshan forces.
 Zhang Wei, titled "Flying Tiger Great General", duels with Qin Ming. He is killed by Sun Li.
 Xu Fang, titled "Flying Bear Great General", duels with Hua Rong. He is captured by Zhu Tong.
 Guo Shiguang, titled "Flying Panther Great General", duels with Huang Xin. He perishes together with Xuan Zan in a duel under Yinma Bridge in Suzhou.
 Wu Fu, titled "Sky Soaring Great General", duels with Xu Ning. He is killed by Fan Rui.
 Gou Zheng, titled "Flying Cloud Great General", duels with Zhu Tong and ends up being killed by his opponent.
 Zhen Cheng, titled "Flying Mountain Great General", duels with Sun Li. He is captured by Shi Jin.
 Chang Sheng, titled "Flying Water Great General", duels with Hao Siwen. He is killed by Li Jun.

"12 Deities of Jiangnan"
The "12 Deities of Jiangnan" are 12 warriors serving under Lü Shinang.

 Shen Gang, nicknamed "Heaven Supporting Deity", is killed by Shi Jin.
 Pan Wende, nicknamed "Youyi Deity", is killed by Zhang Heng.
 Shen Ze, nicknamed "Giant Deity", is killed by Liu Tang.
 Zhuo Wanli, nicknamed "Yellow Flagpole Deity", is captured by Kong Ming and Kong Liang.
 He Tong, nicknamed "Leopard's Tail Deity", is captured by Xiang Chong and Li Gun.
 Xu Tong, nicknamed "Liuding Deity", is killed by Hao Siwen.
 Gao Keli, nicknamed "Tai Sui Deity", kills Han Tao. He is killed by Li Kui later.
 Zhang Jinren, nicknamed "Thunderbolt Deity", kills Peng Qi. He is killed by Bao Xu later.
 Fan Chou, nicknamed "Diaoke Deity", is captured by Wang Ying and Hu Sanniang, and later executed.
 Shen Bian, nicknamed "Death Deity", is killed by Xuan Zan and Hao Siwen.
 Zhao Yi, nicknamed "Taibai Deity", attempts to hide among civilians after his defeat. The civilians capture and hand him over to the Liangshan forces.
 Ying Ming, nicknamed "Armoured Deity", is killed in battle.

"Four Dragons of Zhejiang"
The "Four Dragons of Zhejiang" (浙江四龍) are four commanders of Fang La's naval forces at Muzhou and Black Dragon Ridge. After their defeat, Di Yuan and Qiao Zheng go missing; Cheng Gui and Xie Fu attempt to escape but are captured by civilians, handed over to the Liangshan forces, and subsequently executed.

 Cheng Gui, nicknamed "Jade-Clawed Dragon"
 Di Yuan, nicknamed "Bright-Scaled Dragon"
 Qiao Zheng, nicknamed "Wave-Crashing Dragon"
 Xie Fu, nicknamed "Pearl-Chasing Dragon"

Changzhou
 Qian Zhenpeng is in charge of guarding Changzhou. He is killed by Guan Sheng.
 Jin Jie has long harboured the intention of surrendering to the Song Empire. Acting on his wife's advice, he defects to the Liangshan forces and assists them in capturing Changzhou. After the campaign, he continues serving the Song Empire and fights in the Jin–Song Wars.
 Qin Yulan is Jin Jie's wife.
 Xu Ding

Jiangyin and Taicang
 Yan Yong is in charge of guarding Jiangyin and Taicang. He is killed by Ruan Xiaoer.
 Li Yu is killed by Liangshan archers.

Xiuzhou
 Duan Kai is in charge of guarding Xiuzhou. He surrenders to the Liangshan forces.

Xuanzhou
 Jia Yuqing is in charge of guarding Xuanzhou. He escapes to Huzhou after the fall of Xuanzhou.
 Li Shao duels with Huyan Zhuo and gets killed in battle.
 Han Ming is killed by Dong Ping.
 Du Jingchen is killed by Lin Chong.
 Lu An is killed by Suo Chao.
 Pan Jun is knocked off horseback by Zhang Qing and is killed by Li Zhong.
 Cheng Shengzu duels with Mu Hong. He escapes and goes missing after the fall of Xuanzhou.

Dusong Pass
 Wu Sheng is in charge of guarding Dusong Pass (located south of present-day Anji County, Zhejiang). He is captured by Sun Xin and Gu Dasao.
 Jiang Yin is wounded by Lin Chong and captured by Li Li and Tang Long.
 Wei Heng is captured by Shi Qian and Bai Sheng.

Yuling Pass
 Pang Wanchun, nicknamed "Little Yang Youji", is a highly skilled warrior and archer serving under Fang La. He is in charge of guarding Yuling Pass (near present-day Zhupu Village, She County, Anhui). He kills Shi Jin and Ou Peng with arrow shots, while his archers kill Shi Xiu, Chen Da, Yang Chun, Li Zhong and Xue Yong during the battle of Yuling Pass. He is later captured by Tang Long and executed by the Liangshan forces.
 Lei Jiong is Pang Wanchun's deputy. He is captured by Sun Li and subsequently executed.
 Ji Ji is Pang Wanchun's deputy. He is captured by Wei Dingguo and subsequently executed.

Dongguan and Black Dragon Ridge
 Wu Yingxing is in charge of guarding Dongguan near Black Dragon Ridge (northeast of present-day Meicheng Town, Jiande, Zhejiang). He is killed by Li Ying in Muzhou.
 Bai Qin indirectly causes Ma Lin's death by injuring him; Shi Bao then finishes off the wounded Ma Lin. During the battle of Black Dragon Ridge, he duels Lü Fang and perishes together with his opponent.
 Jing De duels with Guo Sheng and reaches a draw with his opponent. He is killed by the Song general Wang Bing at Black Dragon Ridge.
 Xiahou Cheng duels Lu Zhishen during the battle of Qingxi County and attempts to flee after his defeat. However, Lu Zhishen catches up with him and kills him.

Huzhou
 Gong Wen is in charge of guarding Huzhou.
 Ye Gui

Yangzhou
 Chen Guan is a rich man who pledged to use his wealth to help Fang La in his rebellion in exchange for the position of governor of Yangzhou. The Liangshan forces eventually defeat Fang La's forces and capture Yangzhou.
 Chen Yi is Chen Guan's son.
 Chen Tai is Chen Guan's son.

Others
 Hu Cheng is Hu Sanniang's elder brother. He pleads with the Liangshan outlaws to release his sister after she is captured by them. Song Jiang agrees on the condition that Hu Cheng brings one of the three Zhu brothers in exchange for her. When Zhu Biao flees to Hu Cheng's village after his defeat, Hu Cheng captures and escorts him to the Liangshan camp. Along the way, they meet Li Kui, who decapitates Zhu Biao.
 Li Shishi is a courtesan living in the capital. Emperor Huizong is one of her regular clients. She helps the Liangshan outlaws in obtaining amnesty from the emperor.

Characters mentioned by name
 Hong Xin was a Grand Marshal sent by Emperor Renzong to seek Celestial Master Zhang to help them in combating a plague. After completing his mission and before returning to the capital, he visited the temple near where the Master resided and unsuspecting released 108 demons trapped in a secret chamber for centuries. The demons spread out throughout the land after their release and are reborn as the 108 Stars of Destiny. As if Hong Xin's actions were predestined, a stone tablet that stood on the location where the demons were imprisoned had the words "Opens when Hong (Xin) arrives" carved on it.
 Celestial Master Zhang, also known as Celestial Master Xujing, was a Taoist sage and an heir of Zhang Daoling. Emperor Shenzong sent Hong Xin in search of him to help in combating a plague. Hong Xin reached Mount Dragon Tiger in Xinzhou, Jiangxi, where the Master resided. The priests at the temple told Hong Xin that he must travel up the mountain alone to find the Master as a test of his courage and faith. Hong Xin met a young cowherd, who told him that the Master already knew about the plague and was on his way to the capital. Upon returning to the temple, the priests told Hong Xin that the cowherd was actually the Master.
 Master Dongxuan was a Taoist who lived during the Tang dynasty. He subdued the 108 demons and imprisoned them in a secret chamber in the temple on Mount Dragon Tiger. Centuries later, the demons were released accidentally by Hong Xin and were later reborn as the 108 Stars of Destiny.

Notes

References

 
 
 
 
 
 
 
 

 
Lists of literary characters
Lists of minor fictional characters
Lists of fictional Chinese people